Marshall Sylvester Carter (September 16, 1909 – February 18, 1993) was a lieutenant general in the United States Army. From 1965 to 1969, he served as Director of the National Security Agency.

Life and career
Carter was born on September 16, 1909 at Fort Monroe, Virginia, the son of future Brigadier general Clifton C. Carter. He graduated from the United States Military Academy in 1931 and took an M.S. degree from the Massachusetts Institute of Technology in 1936.

Carter served as an aide to General George C. Marshall during Marshall's time as Chief of Staff of the United States Army, Secretary of State, and Secretary of Defense.

Carter, then a lieutenant general, served as Deputy Director of Central Intelligence from April 3, 1962, to April 28, 1965. From 1965 to 1969, he served as Director of the National Security Agency. Upon retirement from the military, he served as President of the George C. Marshall Research Foundation until retiring from that position in 1985.

Carter was inducted into the Military Intelligence Hall of Fame. He was portrayed by Ed Lauter in the film Thirteen Days (2000), based on events occurring during the Cuban Missile Crisis. Carter is buried  in Arlington National Cemetery with his wife, Preot Nichols Carter (1912–1997).

Carter died of liver cancer on Feb 18, 1993 in his home in Colorado Springs

Decorations

References

1909 births
1993 deaths
People from Hampton, Virginia
Army Black Knights men's ice hockey players
United States Army personnel of World War II
United States Army generals
Directors of the National Security Agency
Deputy Directors of the Central Intelligence Agency
Burials at Arlington National Cemetery
United States Military Academy alumni
Massachusetts Institute of Technology alumni
Recipients of the Distinguished Service Medal (US Army)
Recipients of the Legion of Merit
Commanders of the Order of Orange-Nassau